Kioumars Heydari is an Iranian general. , he is Commander of the Iranian Army's Ground Forces.

References

Living people
Islamic Republic of Iran Army brigadier generals
Place of birth missing (living people)
1964 births
Commanders of Islamic Republic of Iran Army Ground Force
Islamic Republic of Iran Army personnel of the Iran–Iraq War
Iranian individuals subject to the U.S. Department of the Treasury sanctions
People from Sahneh